Hughes Stadium may refer to:

Sonny Lubick Field at Hughes Stadium in Fort Collins, Colorado
Charles C. Hughes Stadium in Sacramento, California
Hughes Stadium (Morgan State), a 10,000 seat facility in Baltimore, Maryland on the campus of Morgan State University